Mizanur Rahman Kazi is an Indian Bengali doctor and politician. He is the current MLA for the Rajabala constituency in the Meghalaya Legislative Assembly. Kazi is a fellow of the Indian Association of Clinical Medicine and recipient of the Distance Fellowship in Diabetes Management (DFID) from Christian Medical College Vellore.

Early life and education
Mizanur Rahman Kazi was born into a Bengali Muslim family of Qadis in Rajabala located in the West Garo Hills district of Meghalaya. His father was Abdul Jalil Kazi. His wife is a businesswoman. Kazi graduated from the Sarojini Naidu Medical College under Dr. Bhimrao Ambedkar University in 2005 with a Bachelor of Medicine, Bachelor of Surgery degree and became a private medical practitioner. He owns land in Meghalaya plains and Dhubri.

Political career
Kazi contested in the 2013 Meghalaya Legislative Assembly election for the Rajabala constituency as a United Democratic Party candidate but was unsuccessful. At the 2018 Meghalaya Legislative Assembly election, he contested as a National People's Party but was not elected. He joined the All India Trinamool Congress for the 2023 Meghalaya Legislative Assembly election where he was successfully elected, defeating four-time MLA Abdus Saleh of the NPP by 10 votes.

References

Meghalaya MLAs 2023–2028
21st-century Bengalis
People from West Garo Hills district
21st-century Indian Muslims
Indian Sunni Muslims
1976 births
Living people
Trinamool Congress politicians
National People's Party (India) politicians
Sarojini Naidu Medical College alumni
Dr. Bhimrao Ambedkar University alumni
United Democratic Party (Meghalaya) politicians
Trinamool Congress politicians from Meghalaya